Pejman is a masculine Iranian given name or surname. It may refer to:

Given name
 Pejman Akbarzadeh, Iranian musician
 Pejman Bazeghi, Iranian actor
 Pejman Hadadi, Iranian musician
 Pejman Montazeri, Iranian footballer

Surname
 Ahmad Pejman, Iranian musician
 Bob Pejman, Persian-American artist/painter
 Hamidreza Pejman, film producer and founder of the Pejman Foundation

Persian-language surnames
Persian masculine given names